This is a list of artists who formerly recorded for TVT Records.
Listed in parentheses are names of affiliated labels for which the artist recorded for TVT in conjunction with.



0–9
 213

A
 The A'z
 A Cult Called Karrianna
 Ambulance LTD
 Autechre (Wax Trax!/TVT)

B
 The Baldwin Brothers
 Bender
 Bennett, Paris
 Birdbrain
 Black, Oliver
 The Blue Van
 Bobaflex
 Bounty Killer
 Brian Jonestown Massacre
 Buck-O-Nine

C
 Catherine
 The Cinematics
 Closure
 Coleman, Jaz
 The Connells
 Course of Empire
 Cubanate

D
 Default
 Die Warzau
 Doggy's Angels
 Dudley, Anne
 Dude 'n Nem

E
 Tha Eastsidaz
 Emergency Broadcast Network

F
 Full Force

G
 Mic Geronimo (Blunt/TVT)
 Gravity Kills
 Guided by Voices
 GZR

H
 Hernandez, Marcos
 The Holloways
DJ Hurricane

I
 In the Nursery (Wax Trax!/TVT)

J
 Ja Rule
 Jacki-O
 Joe Budden
 Jurassic 5
 Juster
 Just Jack
 Juno Reactor (Wax Trax!/TVT)

K
 KMFDM (Wax Trax!/TVT)

L
 Shona Laing
 Lil Jon and the Eastside Boyz
 Lumidee

M
 Magic
 Modern English
 Moses, Teedra
 Mood

N
Nashville Pussy
 Naughty by Nature
 New Years Day
 Nine Inch Nails
 Nothingface

O
 Oobie

P
 Page, Jimmy
 Pay the Girl
 Pitbull
 The Polyphonic Spree
 Psychic TV
 Psykosonik
 Polygon Window (Wax Trax!/TVT)

R
 Rise Robots Rise
 Royal Flush

S
 Sister Machine Gun
 Southern Culture on the Skids
 Spookey Ruben
 The Saints
 Gil Scott-Heron
 Sevendust
Slo Leak
 Speech
 Starchildren
The Strays

T
 Towers of London
 Tsar
 Twisted Black

U
 The Unband
 Underworld

V
 Vallejo
 VNV Nation
 Vision of Disorder

W
 Wayne
 The Wellwater Conspiracy
 Wyatt, Keke

X
 XTC

Y
 Ying Yang Twins
 Yo Gotti

References

TVT Records